The Cumberland Coalfield is a coalfield in Cumbria, north-west England. It extends from Whitehaven in the south to Maryport and Aspatria in the north.

Geology
The following coal seams occur within the Coal Measures Group in this coalfield. Not all seams are present in any one part of the coalfield:

Middle Coal Measures Formation
 (series of unnamed coals)
 Brassy
 Black Metal
 Fireclay
 White Metal
 Little
 Slaty
 Tenquarters
 Rattler
 Bannock Band
 Main Band
 Lower Metal
 Yard Cannel Band
 Yard
 Lower Yard
There is also a Crow seam between the Metal and Bannock seams.

Lower Coal Measures Formation
 Half Yard
 Two Foot
 Little Main
 Eighteen Inch
 Lickbank
 Sixquarters
 Parrot
 Upper Threequarters Rider
 Upper Threequarters
 Lower Threequarters
 Upper Albrighton
 Middle Albrighton
 Lower Albrighton
 Harrington Four Foot

Towards the top of the underlying Stainmore Formation (or Hensingham Formation), which is of Namurian age, are the:
 Udale Coal
 Bedlam Gill Coal
 (unnamed coals)

See also
 Cumberland Miners' Association

References

Coal mining regions in England
Geology of Cumbria
Mining in Cumbria